35P/Herschel–Rigollet is a periodic comet with an orbital period of 155 years. It fits the classical definition of a Halley-type comet with (20 years < period < 200 years). It was discovered by Caroline Herschel (Slough, United Kingdom) on 1788-12-21. Given that the comet has a 155 year orbit involving asymmetric outgassing, and astrometric observations in 1939 were not as precise as modern observations, predictions for the next perihelion passage in 2092 vary by about a month.

1789 apparition
Caroline Herschel first observed the comet on 21 December 1788 and it was observed later that night by her brother William Herschel who described it as looking like a bright nebula and about 5-6 minutes in diameter, and much larger than the planetary nebula M57.

Through December and January the comet was observed by Nevil Maskelyne at the Greenwich Observatory and by Charles Messier at the Paris Observatory. Maskelyne was the last observer of the comet, his final observation taking place on 1789-02-05.

Similar possible orbits for the comet were calculated in 1789 by Pierre Méchain and in 1922 by Margaretta Palmer. Palmer considered that the orbit which best fitted the observations was an elliptical one with a period of 1,066 years.

1939 apparition
Roger Rigollet (Lagny, France) rediscovered the comet on 1939-07-28; it was described as diffuse and with a magnitude of 8.0. The sighting was confirmed the next day by Alfonso Fresa of the Observatory of Turin (Italy) and George van Biesbroeck of the Yerkes Observatory. The comet steadily faded after August, final (photographic) observations being obtained on 1940-01-16.

Following the 1939 rediscovery, the comet's orbit was calculated by Jens P. Möller (Copenhagen, Denmark), and Katherine P. Kaster and Thomas Bartlett (Berkeley, USA). A perihelion date of 1939-08-09 was indicated. Based on these early orbits, Leland E. Cunningham of the Harvard College Observatory suggested that the comet was likely identical with Herschel's comet of 1788.

The final calculation of the orbit, by Brian G. Marsden in 1974, used 75 positions from both apparitions of the comet in 1788 and 1939–40 in addition to perturbations by planets, and linked the two sightings, with a perihelion date of 1939-08-09 and a period of 155 years.

Closest approaches to Earth
 1788-11-04 – 0.80 AU from Earth
 1939-07-30 – 0.82 AU from Earth

References

External links
 Orbital simulation from JPL (Java) / Horizons Ephemeris
 35P/Herschel-Rigollet – Seiichi Yoshida @ aerith.net

Periodic comets
Halley-type comets
0035
035P
17881221
Discoveries by Caroline Herschel